The Bulgarian football club FC Lokomotiv Sofia has frequently competed in international tournaments within Europe, in particular the UEFA Champions League, the UEFA Cup Winners' Cup, and most recently the UEFA Europa League. Out of 50 appearances in these competitions since 1964, the team has won 18, drawn 12 and lost 20.

Total statistics

Statistics by country

Statistics by competition

UEFA Champions League / European Cup

UEFA Cup Winners' Cup / European Cup Winners' Cup

UEFA Europa League / UEFA Cup

References

Lokomotiv Sofia
Lokomotiv